Narvaez is a surname of Spanish and also Basque origin, and may refer to:

Darcia Narvaez, American psychologist
Francisco de Narváez (born 1953), Colombian-born politician and businessman
Kiko (footballer, born 1972), born Francisco Miguel Narváez Machón, Spanish football player
Frankie Narvaez (1939–2004), Puerto Rican boxer
Israel Narvaez, gang leader in New York
José María Narváez (1768–1840), Spanish explorer and navigator
Leonardo Narváez (born 1980), Colombian track cyclist
Luis de Narváez (fl. 1526–1549), Spanish composer
Luis Pacheco de Narváez (1570–1640), Spanish author
Manuel Narvaez (born 1981), Puerto Rican basketball player
Omar Andrés Narváez (born 1975), Argentinian boxer
Omar Narváez (baseball) (born 1992), Venezuelan baseball player
Pánfilo de Narváez (1478–1528), Spanish conquistador and explorer
Paula Narváez (born 1972), Chilean psychologist and politician
Ramón María Narváez y Campos, 1st Duke of Valencia (1800–1868), Spanish general and statesman
Juanjo Narváez (born 1995), Colombian footballer

References

Surnames
Spanish-language surnames
Basque-language surnames
Surnames of Puerto Rican origin